Jimmy London may refer to:

 Jimmy London (reggae singer) (born 1949), Jamaican reggae singer
 Jimmy London (rock singer) (born 1975), Brazilian punk/rock singer